Red Bud is an unincorporated community in  Gordon County, Georgia, United States.

History
A post office called Red Bud was established in 1852, and remained in operation until being discontinued in 1928. The community was named for a grove of red bud trees near the original town site.

Notable People 
George Right Smith - (1837 - 1903), Private in the Confederate Army elevated to the rank of 1st Lieutenant. After the war, bought a farm just south of Redbud settling very close to his wife's (Spencer) family farm.

Education
red bud middle school
red bud elementary school

References

Unincorporated communities in Gordon County, Georgia
Unincorporated communities in Georgia (U.S. state)